Estero Seco Airport (},  is an airstrip in the Pirque commune of the Santiago Metropolitan Region in Chile.

There are hills east of the runway, and rising terrain south through northwest.

See also

Transport in Chile
List of airports in Chile

References

External links
OpenStreetMap - Estero Seco
OurAirports - Estero Seco
FallingRain - Estero Seco Airport

Airports in Chile
Airports in Santiago Metropolitan Region